John Edward Costello (1943- 26 August 1995) was a British military historian, who wrote about World War I, World War II and the Cold War.

He was born in Greenock near Glasgow and graduated from Cambridge University in law and Soviet economic history. At Cambridge he was secretary of the Union and chairman of the Conservative Association.

He then worked as a director and scriptwriter for the BBC before writing on military history.

He died unexpectedly at the age of 52 while on a flight from London to Miami, having gone to Britain for research. He was living in Miami and Manhattan.

Published works  
 The Battle for Concorde (UK) (1971) with Terry Hughes , or The Concorde Conspiracy (US) (1976) 
D-Day (1974) with Warren Tute & Terry Hughes 
Jutland 1916 (1976) with Terry Hughes 
 The Battle of the Atlantic (1977) with Terry Hughes 
 The Pacific War (1981) 
 Virtue under Fire: How World War II Changed Our Social and Sexual Attitudes (US) (1985) , or Love, Sex and War: Changing Values 1939–45 (UK) (1985) 
 "And I was There": Pearl Harbor and Midway – Breaking the Secrets (1985) with Rear Admiral Edwin Layton (his story) & Captain Roger Pineau 
 Mask of Treachery (1988) about Anthony Blunt 
 Ten Days to Destiny (US)  or Ten Days that Saved the West (UK) (1991), about Rudolf Hess 
 Deadly Illusions (1993) with Oleg Tsarev, about Aleksandr Mikhailovich Orlov 
 Days of Infamy: MacArthur, Roosevelt, Churchill – the Shocking Truth Revealed  (1994) about the defeats at Pearl Harbor and the Philippines

References  

Historians of World War I
Historians of World War II
Cold War historians
1943 births
1995 deaths
British military historians
20th-century British historians
Alumni of the University of Cambridge
People from Greenock
20th-century Scottish writers
Scottish military historians